Howard Leroy Ferrell Jr. (September 21, 1929 – October 11, 2002), nicknamed "Toots", was an American Negro league pitcher in the 1940s.

A native of Chestertown, Maryland, Ferrell made his Negro leagues debut at age 17 with the Newark Eagles in 1947. He went on to play for the Baltimore Elite Giants in 1948 and 1949, and served in the US Army during the Korean War. Ferrell was inducted into the Delaware Sports Museum and Hall of Fame in 2000, and died in Newark, Delaware in 2002 at age 73.

References

External links
 and Seamheads
 Leroy 'Toots' Ferrell at Negro League Baseball Players Association

1929 births
2002 deaths
Baltimore Elite Giants players
Newark Eagles players
Baseball pitchers
Baseball players from Maryland
People from Chestertown, Maryland
United States Army personnel of the Korean War
20th-century African-American sportspeople
21st-century African-American people